Sand Point Beach is an unincorporated community in the Canadian province of Saskatchewan. Listed as a designated place by Statistics Canada, the community had a population of 64 in the Canada 2006 Census.

References 

Former designated places in Saskatchewan
Marquis No. 191, Saskatchewan
Unincorporated communities in Saskatchewan